The 1976 Belgian Grand Prix was a Formula One motor race held at Zolder, near Heusden-Zolder in Belgium on 16 May 1976. The race was the fifth round of the 1976 Formula One season. It was the 34th Belgian Grand Prix and the third to be held at Circuit Zolder. Zolder was a replacement venue as Nivelles-Baulers near Brussels was due to host the race in rotation with Zolder but the track surface at Nivelles had deteriorated and Zolder would host the race until the return of Circuit de Spa-Francorchamps in 1983. The race was held over 70 laps of the 4.3-kilometre circuit for a total race distance of 298 kilometres.

The race was won by Ferrari driver, Niki Lauda driving a Ferrari 312T2, who increased his lead in the World Drivers' Championship to 29 points by doing so. His Swiss teammate, Clay Regazzoni, finished the race in second position, 3.4 seconds behind Lauda. Third was taken by French driver Jacques Laffite driving a Ligier JS5. It was Lauda's fourth win of the year in what was a dominant display by the reigning champion. Laffite's third place was his second podium after finishing second in the 1975 German Grand Prix the previous year and the first such finish for the new Équipe Ligier team.

Qualifying

Qualifying classification 

*Drivers with a red background failed to qualify

Race

Race summary
Ferrari had locked out the front row in qualifying, with Lauda on pole from Regazzoni. Lauda motored away as the start, with Hunt up to second but Regazzoni soon took the place back. The Ferraris raced away, and Hunt dropped to sixth position, behind Jacques Laffite's Ligier and the two six-wheeled Tyrrell P34s, before eventually retiring with a transmission failure. Patrick Depailler also retired when his engine blew up. Lauda won, and Regazzoni completed a dominant Ferrari 1-2. Laffite inherited third with the retirements of James Hunt (McLaren M23) and Depailler. Jody Scheckter finished fourth in his Tyrrell. A lap behind, future world champion Alan Jones took his second points finish in his Surtees TS19 with Jochen Mass collecting the final point in the second McLaren after Chris Amon's Ensign N176 shed a wheel and rolled.

Classification

Championship standings after the race
Points are accurate at the conclusion of the race and do not include amended results of the 1976 Spanish Grand Prix as it was under appeal.

Drivers' Championship standings

Constructors' Championship standings

Note: Only the top five positions are included for both sets of standings.

References

Belgian Grand Prix
Belgian Grand Prix
Grand Prix
Circuit Zolder